The Overflow of Clancy is a poem written under the pseudonym "H.H.C.C" and first published in The Bulletin magazine on 20 August 1892 as part of the Bulletin Debate, a series of poems about the true nature of life in the Australian bush. 
The poem is a parody of Paterson's Clancy of the Overflow.

Colin Roderick, in his biography Banjo Paterson: Poet by Accident (1993), states on page 76 that he believes the poem was written by Henry Lawson.

However, Herbert Humphrey Cripps-Clark (1860–1929) was a contemporary poet whose initials were the same as those of the pseudonym.

See also

 1892 in poetry
 1892 in literature
 Australian literature

External sources
Trove

Australian poems
1892 poems
Bulletin Debate
Works originally published in The Bulletin (Australian periodical)